This is a list of awards and nominations received by the female American country music trio, the Chicks (formerly known as the Dixie Chicks).

Academy of Country Music Awards
The Academy of Country Music Awards are awards given for outstanding achievement in country music, by the Academy of Country Music. The Dixie Chicks have won eight awards and earned fifteen nominations.

!Ref
|-
|rowspan=3|1999
|rowspan=2|Dixie Chicks
|Top New Vocal Duet or Group
|
|rowspan=3|
|-
|Top Vocal Duo or Group
|
|-
|Wide Open Spaces
|Album of the Year
|
|-
|rowspan=5|2000
|Fly
|Album of the Year 
|
|rowspan=5|
|-
|rowspan=2|Dixie Chicks
|Top Vocal Duo or Group of the Year
|
|-
|Entertainer of the Year
|
|-
|"Ready to Run"
|Single Record of the Year
|
|-
|"Ready to Run"
|Video of the Year
|
|-
|rowspan=3|2001
|"Goodbye Earl"
|Video of the Year
|
|rowspan=3|
|-
|rowspan=5|Dixie Chicks
|Top Vocal Group of the Year
|
|-
|Entertainer of the Year
|
|-
|2002
|Top Vocal Group of the Year
|
|
|-
|rowspan=3|2003
|Top Vocal Group of the Year
|
|rowspan=3|
|-
|Entertainer of the Year
|
|-
|Home
|Album of the Year
|
|}

American Music Awards
The American Music Awards is an annual American music awards show, winners are determined voting by the general public. The Dixie Chicks have won four awards from seven nominations. 

!Ref
|-
|rowspan=2|1999
|rowspan=3|Dixie Chicks
|Favorite New Country Artist
|
|rowspan=2|
|-
|Favorite Country Band, Duo or Group
|
|-
|rowspan=2|2000
|Favorite Country Band, Duo or Group
|
|rowspan=2|
|-
|Fly
|Favorite Country Album
|
|-
|2001
|rowspan=2|Dixie Chicks
|Favorite Country Band, Duo or Group
|
|
|-
|rowspan=2|2003
|Favorite Country Band, Duo or Group
|
|rowspan=2|
|-
|Home
| Favorite Country Album 
|
|}

Billboard Music Awards
The Billboard Music Awards are annual awards based on album and digital songs sales, streaming, radio airplay, touring and social engagement. The Dixie Chicks have won seven awards, with eight nominations. 

!Ref
|-
|rowspan=3|1999 
|rowspan=6|Dixie Chicks
|Country Artist of the Year
|
|rowspan=3|
|-
|Country Duo/Group of the year
|
|-
|Country Albums Artist of the Year
|
|-
|rowspan=4|2000
|Country Artist of the Year
|
|rowspan=4|
|-
|Country Duo/Group of the Year
|
|-
|Country Albums Artist of the Year
|
|-
|Fly
|Country Album of the Year
|
|-
|2017
|Dixie Chicks
|Top Country Tour
|
|
|}

Blockbuster Entertainment Awards
The Blockbuster Entertainment Awards was an annual awards show held from 1995-2001. The Dixie Chicks won two awards.

!Ref
|-
|2000
|Wide Open Spaces
|Favorite Duo or Group - Country
|
|
|-
|2001
|Fly
|Favorite Duo or Group - Country
|
|
|}

British Country Music Association Awards
The British Country Music Association holds annual awards to honor the best in country music. The Dixie Chicks have received one nomination.

!Ref
|-
|2016
|Dixie Chicks
|International Act of the Year 
|
|
|}

Canadian Country Music Association Awards
The Canadian Country Music Association holds annual awards honoring the best in country music. The Dixie Chicks have won three awards from four nominations.

!Ref
|-
|1999
|Wide Open Spaces
|Top Selling Album of the Year
|
|rowspan=4|
|-
|2000
|Fly
|Top Selling Album of the Year
|
|-
|2003
|Home
|Top Selling Album of the Year
|
|-
|2007
|Taking The Long Way
|Top Selling Album of the Year
|
|}

Country Music Association Awards
The Country Music Association Awards are annual awards given for outstanding achievement in country music, and organized by the Country Music Association. The Dixie Chicks have earned seventeen nominations, resulting in ten awards.

!Ref
|-
|rowspan=2|1998
|rowspan=2|Dixie Chicks
|Horizon Award
|
|rowspan=2|
|-
|Vocal Group of the Year
|
|-
|rowspan=4|1999
|rowspan=2|"Wide Open Spaces"
|Single of the Year
|
|rowspan=4|
|-
|Music Video of the Year
|
|-
|rowspan=4|Dixie Chicks
|Vocal Group of the Year
|
|-
|rowspan=2|Entertainer of the Year
|
|-
|rowspan=5|2000
|
|rowspan=5|
|-
|Vocal Group of the Year
|
|-
|Fly
|Album of the Year 
|
|-
|"Goodbye Earl"
|Music Video of the Year
|
|-
|"Roly Poly" (with Asleep at the Wheel)
|Vocal Event of the Year
|
|-
|rowspan=2|2001
|rowspan=4|Dixie Chicks
|Entertainer of the Year
|
|rowspan=2|
|-
|rowspan=3|Vocal Group of the Year
|
|-
|2002
|
|
|-
|rowspan=2|2003
|
|rowspan=2|
|-
|Home
|Album of the Year
|
|-
|2007
|Dixie Chicks
|Vocal Group of the Year
|
|
|}

CMT/TNN Music Awards
The CMT Music Awards are a fan voted awards show designed to celebrate the videos and television performances of country music artists. The Dixie Chicks have won five awards from nineteen nominations.

!Ref
|-
|rowspan=3|1999
|rowspan=2|Dixie Chicks
|Vocal Band of the Year
|
|
|-
|Female Star of Tomorrow
|
|
|-
|Wide Open Spaces
|rowspan=2|Album of the Year
|
|
|-
|rowspan=3|2000
|Fly
|
|
|-
|"Ready to Run"
|Music Video of the Year
|
|
|-
|rowspan=4|Dixie Chicks
|rowspan=2|Group/Duo of the Year
|
|
|-
|rowspan=4|2001
|
|
|-
|Entertainer of the Year
|
|
|-
|Impact Award
|
|
|-
|"Goodbye Earl"
|Music Video of the Year
|
|
|-
|2002
|Dixie Chicks
|Video Visionary Award
|
|
|-
|rowspan=4|2003
|rowspan=4|"Long Time Gone"
|Video of the Year
|
|rowspan=4|
|-
|Group/Duo Video of the Year
|
|-
|Hottest Female Video of the Year
|
|-
|Fashion Plate Video of the Year
|
|-
|rowspan=2|2007
|rowspan=2|"Not Ready to Make Nice"
|Video of the Year
|
|rowspan=2|
|-
|rowspan=2| Group Video of the Year
|
|-
|rowspan=2| 2020
| rowspan=2| "Gaslighter"
|
| rowspan=2| 
|-
| Video of the Year
|
|}

Critics' Choice Awards
The Critics' Choice Awards is an awards show presented annually by the Broadcast Film Critics Association to honor the finest in cinematic achievement. The Dixie Chicks have received one nomination.

!Ref
|-
|2007
|"The Neighbor"
|Best Song
|
|
|}

Grammy Awards
The Grammy Awards are awarded annually by the National Academy of Recording Arts and Sciences. The Dixie Chicks have received thirteen awards from twenty-two nominations.

!Ref
|-
| style="text-align:center;" rowspan="3"| 1999 || Dixie Chicks || Best New Artist ||  || rowspan=3|
|-
| Wide Open Spaces || Best Country Album || 
|-
| "There's Your Trouble" || Best Country Performance by a Duo or Group with Vocal || 
|-
| style="text-align:center;" rowspan="5"| 2000
|rowspan="2"|  Fly || Album of the Year ||  || rowspan=5|
|-
| Best Country Album || 
|-
|rowspan="2"|  "Ready to Run" || Best Country Performance by a Duo or Group with Vocal || 
|-
| Best Country Song (for Martie Seidel) || 
|-
| "Roly Poly" (with Asleep at the Wheel) ||rowspan="3"| Best Country Collaboration with Vocals || 
|-
| style="text-align:center;" rowspan="2"| 2001 || "Strong Enough" (with Sheryl Crow)
|  || rowspan=2|
|-
| "Walk Softly" (with Ricky Skaggs) || 
|-
| style="text-align:center;" rowspan="4"| 2003
|rowspan="2"|Home || Album of the Year ||  || rowspan=4|
|-
| Best Country Album || 
|-
| "Lil' Jack Slade" || Best Country Instrumental Performance|| 
|-
|  "Long Time Gone" ||rowspan="3"| Best Country Performance by a Duo or Group with Vocal || 
|-
| style="text-align:center;"| 2005 || "Top of the World" ||  || 
|-
| style="text-align:center;" rowspan="2"| 2006
|rowspan="2"| "I Hope" ||   || rowspan=2|
|-
| Best Country Song || 
|-
| style="text-align:center;" rowspan="5"| 2007
|rowspan="2"| Taking the Long Way|| Album of the Year ||  || rowspan=5|
|-
|  Best Country Album || 
|-
|rowspan="3"| "Not Ready to Make Nice"|| Record of the Year|| 
|-
| Song of the Year || 
|-
| Best Country Performance by a Duo or Group with Vocal||

French Country Music Awards
The French Association of Country Music holds annual awards to honor the best in country music. The Dixie Chicks have won one award.

!Ref
|-
|2002
|"I Believe In Love"
|Best Video 
|
|
|}

Juno Awards
The Juno Awards are an annual Canadian awards show organized by the Canadian Academy of Recording Arts and Sciences. The Dixie Chicks have won one award.

!Ref
|-
|2007
|Taking the Long Way
|International Album of the Year
|
|
|}

People's Choice Awards
The People's Choice Awards are a venue for the American public to honor their favorite actors and actresses, musical performers, television shows, and motion pictures, and is voted on by the general public. The Dixie Chicks have won once.

!Ref
|-
|2002 
|Dixie Chicks
|Favorite Musical Group or Band
|
|
|}

Radio Music Awards
The Radio Music Awards was an annual American award show that honored the year's most successful songs on mainstream radio. The Dixie Chicks won two awards.

!Ref
|-
|rowspan=2|1999
|Dixie Chicks
|Country Artist of the Year
|
|rowspan=2|
|-
|"Wide Open Spaces"
|Country Song of the Year
|
|}

TNN & CMT Country Weekly Music Awards
The Nashville Network and Country Weekly Music held awards show in 2000 and 2001, the winners where voted upon by the general public. The Dixie Chicks won twice with seven nominations.

!Ref
|-
|rowspan=3|2000
|Fly
|Album of the Year
|
|rowspan=3|
|-
|"Ready to Run"
|Music Video of the Year
|
|-
|rowspan=4|Dixie Chicks
|Group/Duo of the Year
|
|-
|rowspan=4|2001
|Group/Duo of the Year
|
|rowspan=4|
|-
|Entertainer of the year
|
|-
|Impact Award
|
|-
|"Goodbye Earl"
|Music Video of the Year
|
|}

TNN/Music City Awards
The Nashville Network and the Music City News held an annual awards show from 1990 to 1999, winners were voted upon by general public. The Dixie Chicks won two awards from three nominations.

!Ref
|-
|rowspan=3|1999
|rowspan=2|Dixie Chicks
|Vocal Band of the Year
|
|rowspan=3|
|-
|Female Star of Tomorrow
|
|-
|Wide Open Spaces
|Album of the Year
|
|}

Other awards
 1998: Pollstar Concert Industry Awards, Best New Artist Tour
 1999: Entertainment Weekly, The Entertainers '99, #11
 2003: People for the American Way Foundation, Defenders of Democracy Award
 2004: MTV's Rock the Vote, Patrick Lippert Award
 2006: ACLU, Bill of Rights Award
 2007: Texas Film Hall of Fame, AMD LIVE! Soundtrack Award

References

Awards and nominations
Lists of awards received by American musician
Lists of awards received by musical group